China Burma India Theater (CBI) was the United States military designation during World War II for the China and Southeast Asian or India–Burma (IBT) theaters. Operational command of Allied forces (including U.S. forces) in the CBI was officially the responsibility of the Supreme Commanders for South East Asia or China. However, US forces in practice were usually overseen by General Joseph Stilwell, the Deputy Allied Commander in China; the term "CBI" was significant in logistical, material and personnel matters; it was and is commonly used within the US for these theaters.

U.S. and Chinese fighting forces in the CBI included the Chinese Expeditionary Force, the Flying Tigers, transport and bomber units flying the Hump, including the Tenth Air Force, the 1st Air Commando Group, the engineers who built the Ledo Road, the 5307th Composite Unit (Provisional), popularly known as "Merrill's Marauders", and the 5332d Brigade, Provisional or 'Mars Task Force', which assumed the Marauders' mission.

U.S. strategy for China 
Japanese policy towards China had long been a source of international controversy. Western powers had exploited China through the open door policy, advocated by United States diplomat William Woodville Rockhill, while Japan intervened more directly, creating the puppet-state of Manchukuo. By 1937, Japan was engaged in a full-scale war of conquest in China. The infamous Rape of Nanking galvanized Western opinion and led to direct financial aid for the Kuomintang (Nationalists) and increasing economic sanctions against Japan.

In 1941, the U.S. made a series of decisions to support China in its war with Japan: Lend Lease supplies were provided after President Franklin D. Roosevelt announced the defense of China to be vital to the defense of the United States. Over the summer, as Japan moved south into French Indo-China, the U.S., Britain and the Netherlands instituted an oil embargo on Japan, cutting off 90% of its supplies. The embargo threatened the operations of the Kwantung Army, which had over a million soldiers deployed in China. Japan responded with a tightly co-ordinated offensive on 7/8 December, simultaneously attacking Pearl Harbor, the Philippines, Malaya, Singapore, Hong Kong, Guam, Wake Island, and Thailand.

Japan cut off Allied supplies to China that had been coming through Burma. China could be supplied only by flying over the Himalaya mountains ("The Hump") from India, or capturing territory in Burma and building a new road—the Ledo Road.

Burma 

In 1941 and 1942, Japan was overextended. Its naval base could not defend its conquests, and its industrial base could not strengthen its navy. To cut off China from Allied aid, it went into Burma and captured Rangoon on 8 March 1942, cutting off the Burma Road. Moving north, the Japanese took Tounggoo and captured Lashio in northern Burma on 29 April. The British, primarily concerned with India, looked to Burma as the main theater of action against Japan and wanted Chinese troops to fight there.  The United States conjured up visions of millions of Chinese soldiers who would hold the Japanese then throw them back, while providing close-in airbases for a systematic firebombing of Japanese cities. Chinese Nationalist leader Chiang Kai-shek realized it was all fantasy. On the other hand, there were vast sums of American dollars available if he collaborated. He did so and managed to feed his starving soldiers, but they were so poorly equipped and led that offensive operations against the Japanese in China were impossible. However, Chiang did release two Chinese armies for action in Burma under Stilwell. Due to conflicts between Chiang, the British, Stilwell, and American General Claire Chennault, as well as general ill-preparedness against the more proficient Japanese army, the Burma defense collapsed. Stilwell escaped to India, but the recovery of Burma and construction of the Ledo Road to supply China became a new obsession for him.

"On April 14, 1942, William Donovan, as Coordinator of Information (forerunner of the Office of Strategic Services), activated Detachment 101 for action behind enemy lines in Burma. The first unit of its kind, the Detachment was charged with gathering intelligence, harassing the Japanese through guerrilla actions, identifying targets for the Army Air Force to bomb, and rescuing downed Allied airmen. Because Detachment 101 was never larger than a few hundred Americans, it relied on support from various tribal groups in Burma. In particular, the vigorously anti-Japanese Kachin people were vital to the unit's success." Detachment 101's efforts opened the way for Stilwell's Chinese forces, Wingate's Raiders, Merrill's Marauders, and the counter-attack against the Japanese Imperial life-line.

Allied command structure

U.S. and Allied land forces

US forces in the CBI were grouped together for administrative purposes under the command of General Joseph "Vinegar Joe" Stilwell. However, unlike other combat theaters, for example the European Theater of Operations, the CBI was never a "theater of operations" and did not have an overall operational command structure. Initially U.S. land units were split between those who came under the operational command of the India Command under General Sir Archibald Wavell, as the Commander-in-Chief in India, and those in China, which (technically at least) were commanded by Generalissimo Chiang Kai-shek, as the Supreme Allied Commander in China. However, Stilwell often broke the chain of command and communicated directly with the US Joint Chiefs of Staff on operational matters. This continued after the formation of the South East Asia Command (SEAC) and the appointment of Admiral Lord Mountbatten as Supreme Allied Commander.

When joint allied command was agreed upon, it was decided that the senior position should be held by a member of the British military because the British dominated Allied operations on the South-East Asian Theatre by weight of numbers (in much the same way as the US did in the Pacific Theater of Operations). Admiral Lord Mountbatten was appointed as the Supreme Allied Commander of South-East Asia forces in October 1943.

Gen. Stilwell, who also had operational command of the Northern Combat Area Command (NCAC), a US-Chinese formation, was to report in theory to Gen. George Giffard – commander of Eleventh Army Group – so that NCAC and the British Fourteenth Army, under the command of General William Slim, could be co-ordinated. However, in practice, Gen. Stilwell never agreed to this arrangement. Stilwell was able to do this because of his multiple positions within complex command structures, including especially his simultaneous positions of Deputy Supreme Allied Commander South East Asia, and Chief of Staff to Chinese leader Generalissimo Chiang Kai-shek. As SEAC's deputy leader, Stilwell was Giffard's superior, but as operational commander of NCAC, Giffard was Stilwell's superior. As the two men did not get on, this inevitably lead to conflict and confusion.

Eventually at a SEAC meeting to sort out the chain of command for NCAC, Stilwell astonished everyone by saying "I am prepared to come under General Slim's operational control until I get to Kamaing". Although far from ideal, this compromise was accepted.

Although Stilwell was the control and co-ordinating point for all command activity in the theater, his assumption of personal direction of the advance of the Chinese Ledo forces into north Burma in late 1943 meant that he was often out of touch with both his own headquarters and with the overall situation.

Not until late 1944, after Stilwell was recalled to Washington, was the chain of command clarified. His overall role, and the CBI command, was then split among three people: Lt Gen. Raymond Wheeler became Deputy Supreme Allied Commander South East Asia; Major-General Albert Wedemeyer became Chief of Staff to Chiang Kai-shek, and commander of US Forces, China Theater (USFCT). Lt Gen. Daniel Sultan was promoted, from deputy commander of CBI to commander of US Forces, India–Burma Theater (USFIBT) and commander of the NCAC. The 11th Army Group was redesignated Allied Land Forces South East Asia (ALFSEA), and NCAC was decisively placed under this formation. However, by the time the last phase of the Burma Campaign began in earnest, NCAC had become irrelevant, and it was dissolved in early 1945.

U.S. Army and Allied Air Forces

After consultation among the Allied governments, Air Command South-East Asia was formed in November 1943 to control all Allied air forces in the theater, with Air Chief Marshal Sir Richard Peirse as Commander-in-Chief.  Under Peirse's deputy, USAAF Major General George E. Stratemeyer, Eastern Air Command (EAC) was organized in 1943 to control Allied air operations in Burma, with headquarters in Calcutta.  Unlike the strained relations and confusion encountered in coordinating Allied ground force commands, air force operations in the CBI proceeded relatively smoothly.  Relations improved even further after new U.S. military aid began arriving, together with capable USAAF officers such as Brigadier General William D. Old of CGI Troop Carrier Command, and Colonels Philip Cochran and John R. Alison of the 1st Air Commando Group. Within Eastern Air Command, Air Marshal Sir John Baldwin commanded the Third Tactical Air Force, originally formed to provide close air support to the Fourteenth Army. Baldwin was later succeeded by Air Marshal Sir Alec Coryton.  U.S. Brigadier-General Howard C. Davidson and later Air Commodore F. J. W. Mellersh commanded the Strategic Air Force. In the new command, various units of the Royal Air Force and the U.S. Tenth Air Force worked side-by-side.  In the autumn of 1943 SEAAC had 48 RAF and 17 USAAF squadrons; by the following May, the figures had risen to 64 and 28, respectively.

At Eastern Air Command, Gen. Stratemeyer had a status comparable to that of Stilwell. Coordinating the efforts of the various allied air components while maintaining relations with diverse command structures proved a daunting task. Part of Stratemeyer's command, the Tenth Air Force, had been integrated with the RAF Third Tactical Air Force in India in December 1943 and was tasked with a number of roles in support of a variety of allied forces. Another component, the US Fourteenth Air Force in China, was under the jurisdiction of Generalissimo Chiang Kai-shek as China theater commander. Although the India-China Division of the AAF's Air Transport Command received its tonnage allocations from Stratemeyer as Stilwell's deputy, ICD reported directly to Headquarters ATC in Washington, D.C.

In the spring of 1944, with the arrival of command B-29s in the theater, another factor would be added to air force operations. XX Bomber Command of the Twentieth Air Force was tasked with the strategic bombing of Japan under Operation Matterhorn, and reported directly to the JCS in Washington, D.C. However, XX Bomber Command remained totally dependent on Eastern Air Command for supplies, bases, ground staff, and infrastructure support.

After a period of reshuffling, Eastern Air Command's air operations began to show results. In August 1944, Admiral Mountbatten noted in a press conference that EAC fighter missions had practically swept the Japanese air force from Burmese skies. Between the formation of SEAAC in November 1943, and the middle of August 1944, American and British forces operating in Burma destroyed or damaged more than 700 Japanese aircraft with a further 100 aircraft probably destroyed.   This achievement considerably reduced dangers to Air Transport Command cargo planes flying in support of the Hump airlift operation. By May 1944, EAC resupply missions in support of the Allied ground offensive had carried 70,000 tons of supplies and transported a total of 93,000 men, including 25,500 casualties evacuated from the battle areas. These figures did not include tonnage flown in the Hump airlift missions to China.

USAAF Order of Battle 

Tenth Air Force
 1st Air Commando Group (1944–1945)Burma, India (B-25, P-51, P-47, C-47)
 1st Combat Cargo Group (1944–1945)Burma, India, China (C-47, C-46).
 2nd Air Commando Group (1944–1945)Burma, India (P-51, C-47)
 3d Combat Cargo Group (1944–1945)Burma, India (C-47).
 4th Combat Cargo Group (1944–1945)Burma, India (C-47, C-46).
 7th Bombardment Group (1942–1945)India (B-17, B-24).
 12th Bombardment Group (1944–1945)India (B-25).
 33d Fighter Group (1944–1945)India (P-38, P-47)
 80th Fighter Group (1943–1945)India, Burma (P-38, P-40, P-47)

Transferred in 1944 to Fourteenth Air Force:
 311th Fighter Group (1943–1944)India, Burma (A-36, P-51)
 341st Bombardment Group (1943–1944)India, Burma (B-25)
 443d Troop Carrier Group (1944–1945)India (C-47/C-53)
 426th Night Fighter Squadron (1944) India (P-61)
 427th Night Fighter Squadron (1944) India (P-61)

Fourteenth Air Force
 68th Composite Wing
 23d Fighter Group (1942–1945) (P-40, P-51)Formerly American Volunteer Group (AVG) "Flying Tigers". 
 69th Composite Wing
 51st Fighter Group: 1942–1945 (P-40, P-38, P-51).
 341st Bombardment Group 1944–1945 (B-25).
 312th Fighter Wing
 33rd Fighter Group: 1944 (P-38, P-47).
 81st Fighter Group: 1944–1945 (P-40, P-47).
 311th Fighter Group: 1944–1945 (A-36, P-51).
 Chinese-American Composite Wing (Provisional) (1943–1945)
 3rd Fighter Group (Provisional) (P-40, P-51)
 5th Fighter Group (Provisional) (P-40, P-51)
 1st Bombardment Group (Medium, Provisional) (B-25)
 Other assigned units:
 402d Fighter Group:May – July 1943. Assigned but never equipped.
 476th Fighter Group: May – July 1943. Assigned but never equipped.
 308th Bombardment Group:(B-24)March 1943 – February 1945
 From Tenth Air Force in 1944–1945:
 341st Bombardment Group: (B-25)January 1944 – November 1945
 443d Troop Carrier Group: (C-47/C-54) Aug – November 1945
 426th Night Fighter Squadron: P-61) 1944 – 1945
 427th Night Fighter Squadron: (P-61) 1944 – 1945

Twentieth Air Force(Attached To CBI 1944–1945)
 XX Bomber Command (1944–45)(Kharagpur, India)
 1st Photo Squadron
 58th Bombardment Wing(Chakulia, Kharagpur, Hijli AB, India) (B-29)
 40th Bombardment Group
 444th Bombardment Group
 462d Bombardment Group
 468th Bombardment Group

Twentieth Air Force XX Bomber Command (XX BC) combat elements moved in the summer of 1944 from the United States to India where they engaged in very-long-range Boeing B-29 Superfortress bombardment operations against Japan, Formosa, China, Indochina and Burma. While in India, XX BC was supported logistically by Tenth Air Force and the India-China Division of the Air Transport Command. B-29 groups moved to West Field, Tinian, in early 1945.

Timeline

 Early 1942 Stilwell was promoted to lieutenant general and tasked with establishing the CBI. 
 25 February 1942 Stilwell arrived in India by which time Singapore and Burma had both been invaded by the Japanese Army.
 10 March 1942 Stilwell is named Chief of Staff of Allied armies in the Chinese theatre of operations.
 19 March 1942 Stilwell's command in China is extended to include the Chinese 5th and 6th Armies operating in Burma after Chiang Kai-shek gave his permission.
 20 March 1942 Chinese troops under Stilwell engage Japanese forces along the Sittang River in Burma.
 9 April 1942 Claire Chennault inducted into U.S. Army as a colonel, bringing the AVG Flying Tigers squadrons under Stilwell's nominal authority.
 16 April 1942 7,000 British soldiers, and 500 prisoners and civilians were encircled by the Japanese 33rd Division at Yenangyaung.
 19 April 1942 The 113th Regiment of the Chinese Expeditionary Force's New 38th Division led by General Sun Li-jen attacked and defeated the encircling Japanese troops rescuing the encircled British troops and civilians. This is historically called Battle of Yenangyaung.
 2 May 1942 The commander of Allied forces in Burma, General Harold Alexander, ordered a general retreat to India. Stilwell left his Chinese troops and began the long evacuation with his personal staff (he called it a "walk out") to India.
 Most of the Chinese troops, who were supposed to be under Stilwell's command, were deserted in Burma without knowledge of the retreat. Under Chiang Kai-shek they made a hasty and disorganised retreat to India. Some of them tried to return to Yunnan through remote mountainous forests and out of these, at least half died.
 24 May 1942 Stilwell arrived in Delhi.
 New Delhi and Ramgarh became the main training centre for Chinese troops in India. Chiang Kai-shek gave Stilwell command of what was left of the 22nd and 38th Divisions of the Chinese Army.
 1 December 1942 British General Sir Archibald Wavell, as Allied Supreme Commander South East Asia, agreed with Stilwell to make the Ledo Road an American operation.
 August 1943 US creates a jungle commando unit, similar to the Chindits, to be commanded by Major General Frank Merrill; it is informally called "Merrill's Marauders".
 Exhaustion and disease led to the early evacuation of many Chinese and American troops before the coming assault on Myitkyina.
 21 December Stilwell assumed direct control of operations to capture Myitkyina, having built up forces for an offensive in Northern Burma.
 24 February 1944 Merrill's Marauders, attacked the Japanese 18th Division in Burma. This action enabled Stilwell to gain control of the Hakawing Valley.
 17 May 1944 British general Slim in command of the Burma Campaign handed control of the Chindits to Stilwell.
  17 May 1944 Chinese troops, with the help of Merrill's Marauders, captured Myitkina airfield.
 3 August 1944 Myitkina fell to the Allies. The Marauders had advanced 750 miles and fought in five major engagements and 32 skirmishes with the Japanese Army. They lost 700 men, only 1,300 Marauders reached their objective and of these, 679 had to be hospitalized. This included General Merrill who had suffered a second-heart attack before going down with malaria.
 Some time before 27 August 1944, Mountbatten supreme allied commander (SEAC) ordered General Stilwell to evacuate all the wounded Chindits.
 During 1944 the Japanese in Operation Ichi-Go overran US air bases in eastern China. Chiang Kai-shek blamed Stilwell for the Japanese success, and pressed the US high command to recall him.
 October 1944 Roosevelt recalled Stilwell, whose role was split (as was the CBI):
  Lieutenant General Raymond Wheeler became Deputy Supreme Allied Commander South East Asia.
  Major General Albert Wedemeyer became Chief of Staff to Chiang Kai-shek and commander of the U.S. Forces, China Theater (USFCT).
 Lieutenant General Daniel Sultan was promoted from deputy commander to become commander of US Forces India-Burma Theater (USFIBT) and commander of the Northern Combat Area Command
12 January 1945, the first convoy over the Ledo Road of 113 vehicles led by General Pick from Ledo reached Kunming, China on 4 February 1945. Over the next seven months 35,000 tons of supplies in 5,000 vehicles were carried along it.

See also 

 India-China Division
 Chinese Army in India
 Burma campaign
 Philip Cochran
 The Dixie Mission
 U.S. campaigns in World War II – China Burma India Theater
 OSS Detachment 101
 Charles N. Hunter
 Chinese Expeditionary Force (Burma)

References

Citations

Sources 
 Primary sources
 
  a first hand account by the British commander.

 Additional source 
 寻找少校梅姆瑞

Further reading 
 Bidwell, Shelford. The Chindit War: Stilwell, Wingate, and the Campaign in Burma, 1944. (1979)
 Forbes, Andrew and Henley, David (2011). China's Ancient Tea Horse Road. Chiang Mai: Cognoscenti Books. 
 Edwards, Roderick (2020). Should've Been With Me: The Wilfred Scull Story. United States: KDP Books. 
 Hogan, David W.  India-Burma  (1999) Official US Army history pamphlet. Ibiblio.org online edition
 Kraus, Theresa L.  China Offensive  (1999) Brief official US Army history; 24 pp Ibiblio.org online edition
 Latimer, Jon. Burma: The Forgotten War. London: John Murray, 2004.
 Morley, James, ed. The Fateful Choice: Japan's Advance into Southeast Asia, 1939–1941. (1980).
 Lewin, Ronald. The Chief: Field Marshal Lord Wavell, Commander-in-Chief and Viceroy, 1939–1947. (1980).
 MacGarrigle, George L. Central Burma  (1999) Official US Army history pamphlet. Ibiblio.org online edition
 Newell, Clayton R.  Burma, 1942  (1999) Official US Army history pamphlet. Ibiblio.org online edition
 Peers, William R. and Dean Brelis. Behind the Burma Road: The Story of America’s Most Successful Guerrilla Force. Boston: Little, Brown & Co., 1963.
 Romanus, Charles F. and Riley Sunderland. Stilwell's Mission to China (1953) Ibiblio.org online edition; Stilwell's Command Problems (1956) Ibiblio.org online edition; and Time Runs Out in CBI (1958) Ibiblio.org online edition. Official U.S. Army history
 Sherry, Mark D.  China Defensive,  (1999) Official US Army history pamphlet Ibiblio.org online edition
 Tuchman, Barbara. Stilwell and the American Experience in China, 1911–45. (1972) (The British edition is titled Against the Wind: Stilwell and the American Experience in China 1911–45,) excerpt and text search
 Webster, Donovan. The Burma Road: The Epic Story of the China-Burma-India Theater in World War II. (2003)
 Yu, Maochun. The Dragon's War: Allied Operations and the Fate of China, 1937–1947. (2006).

Historiography
 Lee, Lloyd, ed. World War II in Asia and the Pacific and the War's aftermath, with General Themes: A Handbook of Literature and Research. (1998)  online edition
 Resor, Eugene. The China-Burma-India Campaign, 1931–1945: Historiography and Annotated Bibliography (1998) online

External links 

 CHINA-BURMA-INDIA – Remembering the Forgotten Theater of World War II
 CBI Order of Battle: Unit Lineages and History
 Records of U.S. Theaters of War, World War II:332.3.2 Records of Headquarters U.S. Army Forces, China-Burma-India (HQ USAF CBI)
 The China-Burma-India Theater, three volumes in the United States Army in World War II: Reader's Guide series, by the United States Army Center of Military History
 Burma, 1942, a publication of the United States Army Center of Military History
 Central Burma (29 January – 15 July 1945) , a publication of the United States Army Center of Military History
 India-Burma (2 April 1942 – 28 January 1945) , a publication of the United States Army Center of Military History
 Crisis Fleeting: Original Reports on Military Medicine in India and Burma in the Second World War: Office of the US Surgeon General: Office of Medical History (USOMH)
 China-Burma-India Theater on the Internet—List of links
 Forgotten Warriors: China-Burma-India
 OSS Detachment 101 in Burma
 Detachment 101 Office of Strategic Services Burma - April 14, 1942 to July 12, 1945 "The American-Kachin Rangers" 
 Annals of the Flying Tigers
 Animated History of The Burma Campaign
 Night Fighter by J R Smith

 Photographs
 1943–1945 Bert Krawczyk Photos of China during World War II – University of Wisconsin-Milwaukee Libraries Digital Collections

20th century in India
20th century in Myanmar
China in World War II
Japan in World War II
Military history of India during World War II
Military units and formations of the United States Army in World War II
South-East Asian theatre of World War II